Kaúlza de Oliveira de Arriaga, OA, GCC, OC, OIH (18 January 1915 – 2 February 2004) was a Portuguese general, writer, professor and politician. He was Secretary of State (junior minister) of the Air Force between 1953 and 1955 and commander of the Terrestrial Forces in Mozambique from 1969 until 1974 during the Mozambican War of Independence.

Ancestry
He was a son of Manuel dos Santos Lima de Arriaga Nunes (1885-1940), a sculptor and son of a medical doctor from Pico Island, Azores, and his Portuguese Brazilian wife, Felicidade Eugénia Martins de Oliveira (1894-1987), daughter and granddaughter of goldsmiths. The couple married in Porto on 20 June 1914.

Career
Arriaga completed a degree in mathematics and engineering at the University of Porto and then volunteered for the Portuguese Army on 1 November 1935. Taking a military and civil engineering course in the Military Academy which he graduated from in 1939, he was later assigned to the general staff of the Portuguese Institute of Military Studies. Here he petitioned for reforms to the conscription system, as well as training and the integration of paratroopers into the Portuguese Air Force.

Arriaga commanded, as the Commander in Chief of the Armed Forces, the Portuguese forces in Mozambique from 1969 until 1974, taking over from General António Augusto dos Santos and organizing the Operation Nó Górdio ("Gordian Knot Operation") in 1970. This operation was the largest and most expensive military operation performed by the Portuguese Armed Forces during the entire Portuguese Colonial War (1961-1974).

Arriaga was a major political figure in the Estado Novo regime before the Carnation Revolution of 25 April 1974 in Lisbon, holding a number of public positions such as Head of the Ministry of Defense Cabinet, Secretary of State for Aeronautics, Professor of the Institute of High Military Studies, President of the Nuclear Energy Joint Commission and Executive President of the oil company Angol SA. In 1977 he founded MIRN, a right-wing political party, and was its chairman until the party's extinction after the 1980 Portuguese legislative election.

He died from Alzheimer's disease in 2004, in Lisbon.

Decorations
Arriaga received a number of awards and citations during his career, including: 
  Officer of the Order of Aviz
  Grand Officer of the Order of Military Merit of Brazil
  Commander of the Legion of Merit of the United States of America
  Grand Cross of the Order of Christ
  Grand Officer of the Order of Christ
  Grand Officer of the Légion d'honneur of France
  Grand Officer of the Order of Prince Henry (Ordem do Infante Dom Henrique)
 Medal of Aeronautical Merit of the Portuguese Air Force
  Commander of the Order of the Holy Sepulchre

Family
Arriaga married in Reguengos de Monsaraz, at the Chapel of o Monte de São Mamede, on 19 May 1955 Maria do Carmo Fernandes Formigal (b. 1932), Dame Commander of the Order of the Holy Sepulchre, daughter of Mário Formigal (1899-1954), a landowner and son of another, and his wife (m. 1922) Maria Adelaide Rosado Fernandes (1903-1981), of a family of farmers and landowners in Évora, Alto Alentejo, by whom he had five children, including the second wife of former prime minister Pedro Santana Lopes.

Published works
  Atomic Energy  - 1949
  the Portuguese National Defense in Last the 40 years and the Future  - 1966
  Some Nuclear Questions in Portugal  - 1969
  Lições de estratégia de curso de altos comandos—1966/67  (Lessons Of Strategy in the Course of High Command, 1966/67), Vol. 12 (1971)
  The Portuguese Answer  - 1973
  Courage, Tenacity and Faith  - 1973
  the National Conjuncture and My Position before the Moment Portuguese Politician  - 1976
  In the way of the Solutions of the Future  - 1977
  Africa - the Betrayed Victory  (co-author) - 1977
  War and Politics - On behalf of the Decisive Truth, Years  (two editions) - 1987
  Global Strategy  - 1988
  Syntheses  (two editions) - 1992
 '' Maastricht - 1992

See also
 Gordian Knot Operation
 Portuguese Colonial War
 Mozambican War of Independence

References

External links
 Kaúlza de Arriaga - website with published works and biography

1915 births
2004 deaths
People from Porto
Portuguese generals
Portuguese people of Brazilian descent
Deaths from dementia in Portugal
Deaths from Alzheimer's disease
Mozambican War of Independence
University of Porto alumni
Recipients of the Order of Military Merit (Brazil)
Foreign recipients of the Legion of Merit
Knights of the Holy Sepulchre